Hewitt Lake is a lake in the U.S. state of Washington.

Hewitt Lake was named after Judge C. C. Hewitt, an early settler.

27 acres in size with a maximum depth of 60 feet.

See also
List of lakes in Washington

References

Lakes of Thurston County, Washington
Lakes of Washington (state)